The Unionest Party was a provincial political party in Saskatchewan, Canada, in the early 1980s, that advocated union between the four western provinces of Canada (British Columbia, Alberta, Saskatchewan and Manitoba) and the United States.

The party's name was a contraction of ‘best union’.

The party was founded in March 1980 by Dick Collver, a former leader of the Progressive Conservative Party of Saskatchewan, who resigned from the PC caucus when he announced the formation of his new party.

A few days later, another PC  member of the Legislative Assembly of Saskatchewan (MLA), Dennis Ham, also left the PC caucus to join Collver.  (Ham was the brother of Lynda Haverstock, who later  became the leader of the Saskatchewan Liberal Party and later Lieutenant Governor of Saskatchewan.)

The Unionest Party was formed at a time when several western separatist parties (such as the Western Canada Concept) were being formed and attracting considerable attention and support because of dissatisfaction with the federal Liberal government.

The Saskatchewan New Democratic Party government of the day introduced and passed retroactive legislation intended to restrict third party status to a party with at least two sitting members affiliated with a political party that was registered under the Election Act on the day of the last general election.

See also
Western Canada Concept Party of Saskatchewan, a contemporaneous party advocating that Saskatchewan, along with other Western provinces and territories, should secede from Canada
Parti 51, political party in Quebec from 1989 to 1990 then revived in 2016, proposing Quebec should join the United States
List of Canadian political parties
Secessionist movements of Canada

References

Political parties established in 1980
Canada–United States relations
Provincial political parties in Saskatchewan
Defunct secessionist organizations in Canada
Defunct political parties in Canada